Chuthamat Raksat (born 6 July 1993) is a Thai boxer.

She won a medal at the 2019 AIBA Women's World Boxing Championships.

References

1993 births
Living people
Chuthamat Raksat
AIBA Women's World Boxing Championships medalists
Light-flyweight boxers
Boxers at the 2018 Asian Games
Southeast Asian Games medalists in boxing
Chuthamat Raksat
Chuthamat Raksat
Chuthamat Raksat